Cyclocephala nodanotherwon is a species of rhinoceros beetle in the scarab family. It has only been found in Amazonas, Brazil. Brett C. Ratcliffe described and named the species in 1992.

Taxonomic history and etymology
Brett C. Ratcliffe, an entomologist at the University of Nebraska State Museum (UNSM), formally named and described this species, along with eight other Brazilian Cyclocephala species, in a 1992 paper. He based his description of C. nodanotherwon on three specimens, collected from 1980 to 1981 by Robin Best of the National Institute of Amazonian Research. The male holotype and female allotype were both deposited in the UNSM.

The specific name, nodanotherwon, is wordplay referring to the English phrase "not another one". Ratcliffe's description listed its etymology as "the result of an arbitrary combination of letters", but that it resulted in "a species name not inappropriate in such a large genus". Cyclocephala is the largest genus in the subfamily Dynastinae, with approximately 350 described species ; at least 240 Cyclocephala species had already been described by the time Ratcliffe wrote his description of C. nodanotherwon.

Various lists of humorous taxon names have included this species name as an example.

Distribution

Description
Their body is reddish-brown and leather-like, with triangular black marks near their eyes. Their antennae consist of ten segments. It is similar in appearance to C. gravis, C. munda, and C. divaricata.

References

Beetles described in 1992
Beetles of South America
Invertebrates of Brazil
Dynastinae